Rajkot Rural is one of the 182 Legislative Assembly constituencies of Gujarat state in India. It is part of Rajkot district and is reserved for candidates belonging to the Scheduled Castes.

List of segments 

This assembly seat represents the following segments :
 Kotda Sangani Taluka.
 Rajkot Taluka (Part) Villages – Aniyala, Badpar, Bhangda, Bhayasar, Bhupgadh, Chitravav, Dhandhiya, Dhandhni, Dungarpar, Golida, Hadmatiya (Golida), Halenda, Haripar, Hodthali, Kalipat, Kankot, Kasturbadham, Kathrota, Kharachiya, Khokhadadad, Kothariya, Lakhapar, Lampasari, Lodhida, Lothada, Makanpar, Mota Mava, Munjka, Navagam, Padasan, Ramnagar, Rampara, Sajadiali Lili, Sajadiali Suki, Samadhiyala, Sar, Sardhar,Satapar, Umrali, Vajdi (Virda), Vavdi, Vadali.
 Lodhika Taluka – Entire taluka ''except village – Und Khijadiya.
 Rajkot Taluka (Part) – Rajkot Municipal Corporation (Part) Ward No. – 21.

Members of Legislative Assembly

Election results

2022

2017

2012

See also
 List of constituencies of the Gujarat Legislative Assembly
 Rajkot district

References

External links
 

Assembly constituencies of Gujarat
Rajkot district